Schwartz is a last name of German/Yiddish (German-Jewish) origin, meaning "black" (modern spelling in German is  ). It was originally a nickname for someone with black hair or a dark complexion. It may refer to:

A. R. Schwartz (Aaron Robert Schwartz, 1926-2018), Texas politician
Abe Schwartz (1881–1963), musician
Al Schwartz (disambiguation), multiple people
Alba Schwartz (1857–1942), Danish writer
Allyson Schwartz, former US Representative from Pennsylvania
Amy Schwartz, multiple people
Andrea Schwartz (born 1977), Canadian swimmer
Anna Schwartz (1915–2012), American economist
Annetta Schwartz, Romanian musician
Anton Schwartz (born 1967), American jazz musician
Arthur Schwartz (1900–1984)
Barbara Schwartz (artist) (1949–2006), American artist
Barry Schwartz (psychologist) (born 1946), American psychologist
Bernard Schwartz (1925–2010), birth name of American actor Tony Curtis
Ben Schwartz (born 1981), American actor
Bernard L. Schwartz (born 1925)
Berthold Schwartz, monk
Bill Schwartz (disambiguation), several people
Buky Schwartz (1932–2009), Israeli sculptor
Catherine Schwartz (born 1977), American television personality
Chandra Lee Schwartz (born 1981), American theatre performer
David Schwartz (disambiguation)
Delmore Schwartz (1913–1966), American poet and short-story writer
Ed Schwartz (1946–2009), Chicago media personality
Eddie Schwartz (born 1949), Canadian songwriter and record producer
Eduard Schwartz (1858–1940), German classical philologist
Eduardo Schwartz (born 1940), finance academic
Elliott Schwartz (1936–2016), American composer
Evgeny Schwartz (1896-1958), Soviet writer
Geoff Schwartz (born 1986), American NFL football player
Gerry Schwartz (born 1940), Canadian businessman
György Schwartz, aka George Soros (born 1930), billionaire 
George X. Schwartz (1915–2010), American politician
Glenn Schwartz (1940–2018), American musician, member of the band Pacific Gas & Electric
Gustav Schwartz (1809–1890), Austrian paleontologist
Hanit Schwartz (born 1987), Israeli women's soccer goalkeeper
Herbert Schwartz, American college sports coach
Hillel Schwartz (1923–2007), Egyptian politician
Hillel Schwartz (historian) (born 1948), American cultural historian
Howard Schwartz (writer and editor), American folklorist
Isaïe Schwartz (1876–1952), former great rabbi of France
Isadore "Corporal Izzy" Schwartz alias "The Ghetto Midget" (1900–1988), American world champion flyweight boxer
Jack Schwartz (1930–2009), American mathematician & computer scientist
Jaden Schwartz (born 1992), Canadian ice hockey player
Jim Schwartz (born 1966), former NFL head coach, Current Defensive Coordinator for the Philadelphia Eagles
Jean Schwartz (1878–1956), songwriter
Jeffrey H. Schwartz (born 1948), American physical anthropologist
Jeffrey M. Schwartz, American neuroscientist
Jerome T. Schwartz (born 1951), American politician
John Schwartz (disambiguation), several people
Jonathan Schwartz (disambiguation), several people named Jon or Jonathan
Josh Schwartz (born 1976), American writer & producer
Julius Schwartz (1915–2004), editor & agent
Laurent Schwartz (1915–2002), French mathematician
Lillian Schwartz (born 1927), American artist
Louis B. Schwartz (1913-2003), American law professor at the University of Pennsylvania Law School
Margaretta Schwartz, Yiddish singer
Marie Sophie Schwartz (1819–1894), Swedish novelist
Melvin Schwartz (1932–2006), American physicist
Mike Schwartz (born 1949), American-Israeli basketball player and coach
Morrie Schwartz (1916–1995), American academic and author, subject of the book Tuesdays with Morrie
Morris Schwartz (1901–2004), American photographer
Morry Schwartz (born 1948), Australian property developer and publisher
Murray Schwartz (Queens politician) (1919–2001), New York politician
Murray Merle Schwartz (1931–2013), US federal judge from Delaware
Norton A. Schwartz, Chief of Staff of the United States Air Force
Pedro Schwartz, Spanish economist
Pepper Schwartz (born 1945),  American sociologist and sexologist
Peter Schwartz (disambiguation), multiple people
Randal L. Schwartz (born 1961), computer scientist
Richard Schwartz (disambiguation)
Scott Schwartz (born 1968), American child actor
Scott L. Schwartz, American actor best known for "The Bruiser" in the Ocean's Eleven film series
Seymour I. Schwartz (1928-2020), American physician
Sherwood Schwartz (1916–2011), American television writer, producer
Shuki Schwartz (born 1954), Israeli basketball player
Simon Schwartz (born 1982), German illustrator and cartoonist
Stephen Schwartz (composer) (born 1948), American composer and lyricist
Stephen Schwartz (journalist) (born 1948), journalist
Stephen E. Schwartz (born 1941), atmospheric scientist
Tony Schwartz (disambiguation), multiple people
William C. Schwartz (1927–2000), laser scientist
William S. Schwartz (1896–1977), American artist
William Schwartz (law professor) (born 1933)
William Schwartz (physician) (1922–2009)

References 

German-language surnames
Germanic-language surnames
Jewish surnames
Yiddish-language surnames
Surnames from nicknames